Powers Home, also known as Davenport Homestead, is a historic home located in the Lansingburgh section of Troy in Rensselaer County, New York.  It was built in 1846 and is a temple style Greek Revival residence.  It is a "T" shaped residence with a two-story, three bay, frame central block with two flanking wings and one long rear wing. The flanking wings were added in 1883–1884. It features a monumental portico composed of four fluted Ionic order columns.

It was listed on the National Register of Historic Places in 1974.

References

Houses on the National Register of Historic Places in New York (state)
Greek Revival houses in New York (state)
Houses completed in 1846
Houses in Rensselaer County, New York
National Register of Historic Places in Troy, New York